In mathematical finite group theory, a group of GF(2)-type is a group with an involution centralizer whose generalized Fitting subgroup is a group of symplectic type .

As the name suggests, many of the groups of Lie type over the field with 2 elements are groups of GF(2)-type. Also 16 of the 26 sporadic groups are of GF(2)-type, suggesting that in some sense sporadic groups are somehow related to special properties of the field with 2 elements.

 showed roughly that groups of GF(2)-type can be subdivided into 8 types. The groups of each of these 8 types were classified by various authors. They consist mainly of groups of Lie type with all roots of the same length over the field with 2 elements, but also include many exceptional cases, including the majority of the sporadic simple groups. 
 gave a survey of this work.

 gives a table of simple groups  containing a large extraspecial 2-group.

References

  Correction: 

Finite groups